The Stuttgart derby is the name given to football matches between Stuttgarter Kickers and VfB Stuttgart, both of them from Stuttgart, Germany.

All-time results

Head to head results

References

Stuttgarter Kickers
VfB Stuttgart
Association football rivalries in Germany
Football in Stuttgart